Grevillea sessilis is a species of flowering plant in the family Proteaceae and is endemic to north-eastern Queensland. It is a shrub or small tree with divided leaves and cylindrical clusters of white flowers with a creamy-white or greenish yellow style.

Description
The flowers are white with a creamy-white or yellowish green style with a green tip.

Taxonomy
Grevillea sessilis was first formally described in 1926 by Cyril Tenison White and William Douglas Francis from specimens collected by Jess Young near Torrens Creek.

Distribution and habitat
This grevillea grows in open woodland or shrubland in shallow soil over sandstone on low mountain ranges between Cairns, Springsure and Theodore in eastern Queensland.

Conservation status
Grevillea sessilis is listed as "not threatened" under the Queensland Government Nature Conservation Act 1992.

References

sessilis
Flora of Queensland
Proteales of Australia
Plants described in 1926
Taxa named by Cyril Tenison White
Taxa named by William Douglas Francis